Ligfærd (Funeral March/Journey of the Dead) is the second full-length album by Danish one-man Black/Funeral Doom  metal band Nortt, released in 2006 on Total Holocaust Records.

Track listing 
 "Gudsforladt" - 4:04
 "Ligprædike" - 8:36
 "Vanhellig" - 8:07
 "Tilforn Tid" - 12:05
 "Dødsrune" - 8:32
 "Ligfærd" - 3:56

References 

2006 albums
Nortt albums